Malcolm Ludvigsen (born 14 February 1946) is a British mathematician and plein air painter. He is a former research fellow and visiting lecturer in mathematics at the University of York and the author of a book on general relativity. Many of his paintings depict the beaches of the Yorkshire coast.

References

External links
 Official site

1946 births
Living people
20th-century British mathematicians
21st-century British mathematicians
20th-century British painters
British male painters
21st-century British painters
British relativity theorists
20th-century British male artists
21st-century British male artists